"I'm Happy To Be (On This Mountain)" is the first single by Irish band Tír na nÓg. It was released on October 2, 1970 by Chrysalis Records and distributed by Island Records on 7" vinyl with "Let My Love Grow" as its B-side. The German release of the single has an Island logo on a pink label although the Chrysalis logo also appears.

Format and track listing
UK stereo 7" single (WIP 6090)
"I'm Happy To Be (On This Mountain)" (Sonny Condell) – 2:16
"Let My Love Grow" (Condell) – 3:22

Germany 7" stereo single (6014 032)
"I'm Happy To Be (On This Mountain)" (Condell) – 2:16
"Let My Love Grow" (Condell) – 3:22

Personnel
Sonny Condell - vocals, guitar
Leo O'Kelly - vocals, guitar

References

1970 songs
1970 debut singles
Tír na nÓg (band) songs
Song recordings produced by Mike Batt